Kevin M. Brophy (born November 1, 1953) is an American film and TV actor.

Brophy was born in Salt Lake City, Utah. He is best known for his portrayal of the title character in Lucan (1977-78). He appeared with his wife, Amy, in the 1994 film The Magic of the Golden Bear: Goldy III.

Illinois-based Ray Fulk, a man who died in July 2012 at the age of 71, bequeathed half of his estate to the actor in his will, the other half going to his friend and The Young and the Restless star Peter Barton, despite never meeting them. Fulk, who had no family of his own, was a fan of both actors.

Partial filmography
I'm Losing You (1998) .... Conductor
White Dwarf (1995) .... Hospital Orderly
Shattered Image (1994) .... Second Dr. Collins
The Magic of the Golden Bear: Goldy III (1994) .... Melvin
Hart to Hart: Hart to Hart Returns (1993) .... West
Fearless (1993) .... TV Reporter
Fatal Charm (1990) .... Deputy Williams
Code Name Vengeance (1989) .... Chuck
Easy Wheels (1989) .... Tony Wolf
The Delos Adventure (1987) .... Greg Bachman
Time Walker (1982) .... Peter Sharpe
The Seduction (1982) .... Bobby
Hell Night (1981) .... Peter Bennett
Trouble in High Timber Country (1980) .... Tony Aguella
The Long Riders (1980) .... John Younger
Lucan (1977) .... Lucan

Selected TV guest appearances
JAG
Just the Ten of Us
Growing Pains
Finder of Lost Loves
Zorro
Matt Houston
Trapper John, M.D.
The Love Boat
M*A*S*H
The Hardy Boys Mysteries
Star Trek: Deep Space Nine

References

External links

1953 births
Living people
20th-century American male actors
American male film actors
American male television actors
Male actors from Salt Lake City